The Battle of the Niemen River (sometimes referred to as the Second Battle of Grodno) was the second-greatest battle of the Polish–Soviet War. It took place near the middle Neman River between the cities of Suwałki, Grodno and Białystok. After suffering almost complete defeat in the Battle of Warsaw (August 1920), Mikhail Tukhachevsky's Red Army forces tried to establish a defensive line, against Józef Piłsudski's counter-attacking Polish Army, running northward from the Polish-Lithuanian border to Polesie, and centering on Grodno. Between September 15 and September 25, 1920, the Poles outflanked the Soviets, once again defeating them. After the mid-October Battle of the Szczara River, the Polish Army had reached the Tarnopol-Dubno-Minsk-Drissa line.

Although this part of the conflict is usually referred to as a battle both in Polish and Russian historiography, some historians argue that it was more of a military operation with a series of battles fought often several hundred kilometres apart.

Prelude 

Following the Battle of Warsaw in mid-August, the armies in the centre of the Russian front fell into chaos. Mikhail Tukhachevsky ordered a general retreat toward the Bug River, but by then he had lost contact with most of his forces near Warsaw, and all the Bolshevik plans had been thrown into disarray by communication failures. Russian armies retreated in a disorganised fashion, with entire divisions panicking and disintegrating. The Red Army's defeat was so great and unexpected that, at the instigation of Piłsudski's detractors, the Battle of Warsaw is often referred to in Poland as the "Miracle at the Vistula". Previously unknown documents from Polish Central Military Archive found in 2004 proved that the successful breaking of Red Army radio communications ciphers by Polish cryptographers played a great role in the victory.

Although successful, the Polish counter-attack in the battle of Warsaw created an awkward situation for Polish commander in chief Józef Piłsudski. Most of his forces were facing north while Russian heartland was located east of the front rather than north. Because of that, the Polish Army needed some time to reorganise and regroup before a new offensive could be mounted. The Russian commanding officer Mikhail Tukhachevsky took this as an opportunity to establish a new defensive line along the Niemen River, initially safe from Polish forces. The new Soviet line ran from the Russian-Lithuanian demarcation line in the north, to the dense forests and swamps of Polesie, with the city of Grodno (modern Hrodna, Belarus) as a pivot.

Opposing forces 

Both the Polish Army and the opposing Red Army suffered heavy casualties in the course of war, and especially during the Russian summer offensive of 1920. Moreover, both opposing armies were still in the phase of organisation. By August, the Poles mobilised almost 1 million men, which allowed them to reinforce most front-line units to approximately 50-60% of their nominal strength. Out of that number almost 350 000 were in active service on the eastern front, while the rest served in other units or were still training. The Polish brigades and divisions were usually ill-equipped, but were commanded by experienced officers, veterans of the Great War and the subsequent Polish-Ukrainian War. Moreover, with fresh forces arriving to the front almost every week the reserves of the Polish C-i-C were sufficient for waging an offensive war.

The Red Army suffered heavy casualties in the Battle of Warsaw in August and lacked organisation. Although the reserves of fresh, untrained recruits were almost unlimited, the Russian units lacked experienced officers. Also, in the course of the war the Soviet forces lost large parts of their artillery, which was usually used on the battlefield as a last stand against the assaulting enemy. This tactic allowed the Poles to outgun their enemies. Also, the Russian air forces were almost non-existent while the Polish Army could use its few aeroplanes to successfully disrupt enemy moves and conduct intelligence operations.

The Red Army was organised in several fronts. The Western Front facing the Poles had more than 700,000 soldiers in August. However, a large part of its forces were either taken prisoner of war by the Poles, interned in East Prussia or routed. After the arrival of 68,000 reinforcements in August and additional 20,500 in September, the forces of Tukhachevsky reached approximately 20 to 40% of their nominal strength. However, both the morale and the reinforcement abilities of the Russian troops were seriously degraded.

Polish Army 
The order of battle of the Polish Army as after the reorganisation of September 11. The position of units as of September 15, 1920. The armies and divisions are listed north to south.

Plans of both sides 

Russian headquarters seriously overestimated its own forces. Sergey Kamenev ordered Tukhachevsky to mount an all-out counter-offensive as soon as the reorganisation of Russian forces was complete. By August 26 the Russians manned the Neman-Shchara-Svislach line with rump forces to escape the disaster at Warsaw. However, fresh reinforcements from mainland Russia were arriving on a daily basis and by mid-September Tukhachevski managed to recreate most divisions lost in mid-August. His forces quickly rose to over 73.000 soldiers and 220 pieces of artillery.

Following Kamenev's orders, Tukhachevsky planned an offensive of three armies: the 3rd (six divisions under Vladimir Lazarevich), 15th (four divisions under Avgust Ivanovich Kork) and 16th (four divisions under Nikolai Sollogub). The Russian forces were to sweep southwards, retaking the Brest Fortress and Białystok, with the final objective being the city of Lublin. There the Russians could expect reinforcements from other Russian units operating south of the Pinsk Marshes in the Ukraine, as well as experienced troops that could be pulled back from other fronts of the Russian Civil War.

At the same time Józef Piłsudski's main objective was to reorganise his forces and break through the enemy lines along the Neman before Russian defences stiffened, thus disrupting any enemy counter-attack attempts. On September 10, during a staff meeting with his generals, Piłsudski proposed a plan of a major operation near Neman and Shchara rivers. Two Polish armies (2nd under Gen. Edward Rydz and 4th under Gen. Leonard Skierski) were to tie down main Russian forces by a frontal attack aimed at Grodno and Wołkowysk (modern Vaŭkavysk, Belarus). Simultaneously, a strong force detached from the 2nd Army was to outflank the Russians from the north, through a strip of land between Sejny and Druskienniki (modern Druskininkai) controlled by Lithuanian forces and attack the Russian army from behind, in the vicinity of Lida. In the south, the 4th Army was to assault Wołkowysk and prepare to close the encirclement.

Battle

The first action took place on 20 Sept., with the 21st (Alpine) Division attacking Grodno, supported by the Volunteer Division and the 3rd Legionary Division on either flank. Between 23-25 Sept., the battle was evenly balanced.  However, the flanking attack by Gen. Osinski's Suwalki Group, the 1st Legionary Division, and the 1st Lithuanian-Byelorussian Division from Sejny, took Druskienniki on 23 Sept. and cut the Soviet 3rd Army's supply line at the Grodno-Wilno railway. The Polish cavalry reached Radun and then Lida. On 26 Sept., Gen. Krajowski's cavalry took Pinsk, cutting the Soviet 4th Army's supply line.  Tukhachevsky ordered a retreat.

References

Further reading
 
 
 

the Niemen River
1920 in Poland
Niemen River
the Niemen River
History of Grodno
1920 in Belarus
September 1920 events
Western Belorussia (1918–1939)
Military history of Belarus